A Pro-arrhythmic agent is a chemical, drug, or food that promotes cardiac arrhythmias.

Substances

Supplements 
Omega 3 fatty acids.

Foods 
Chocolate, Coffee, Tea

Drugs 
Caffeine, cocaine, beta-adrenergic agonists

Encainide, Lorcainide

See also
Antiarrhythmic agent
Electrophysiology study

References

Antiarrhythmic agents
Cardiac electrophysiology
Medical emergencies